The Count of Monte Cristo is a 1913 silent film adventure directed by Joseph A. Golden and Edwin S. Porter based on Alexandre Dumas' 1844 novel of the same name. It starred James O'Neill, a stage actor and father of playwright Eugene O'Neill. James O'Neill had been playing Edmond Dantès most of his adult life and was famous in the role. Daniel Frohman and Adolph Zukor produced together. Edwin S. Porter co-directed with Joseph Golden, though this was probably necessary as Porter also served as the film's cinematographer. The film was released on November 1, 1913.

A previous film by Selig starring Hobart Bosworth in 1912 had to be pulled from circulation as Zukor brought lawsuit against Selig for copyright infringement.

Preservation status
The film is preserved via paper print at the Library of Congress. It is also in the collections of the National Archives of Canada, Ottawa, the George Eastman House, BFI National Film and Television Archive.

Cast
 James O'Neill - Edmond Dantes/Count of Monte Cristo
 Nance O'Neil - Mercedes
 Murdock MacQuarrie - Danglars

See also
 List of Paramount Pictures films

References

External links
 
 

1913 films
American silent feature films
Films directed by Edwin S. Porter
Famous Players-Lasky films
Films based on The Count of Monte Cristo
American black-and-white films
American adventure films
1913 adventure films
Films directed by Joseph A. Golden
Silent adventure films
1910s American films